Arctopsis is a genus of mites in the family Ascidae.

Species
 Arctopsis inexpectatus Athias-Henriot, 1973

References

Ascidae